The May 1555 papal conclave (15–23 May) was convened on the death of Pope Marcellus II (whose reign had only lasted from 9 April to 1 May that year) and elected Pope Paul IV as his successor.

References
 

1555 in the Papal States
16th-century elections
1555 in politics
1555 05
1555 in Europe
16th-century Catholicism

es:Cónclave para la elección del papa Pablo IV#top